Psathonisi is a small uninhabited island near the castle of Palaiokastro in Ios, Greece. The island is about 50 meters from the main island. It has no beaches because it is very steep with maximum elevation 53 meters and mainly made out of slate and rocks. The name derives from the nearby village Psathi. The island has no trees but some small bushes just like the neighbouring island of Ios. Also it hosts some wild flowers and a lot of cotton thistles.

The island is considered an archaeological site, since it houses remains of a protocyclatic settlement.

References

Ios
Landforms of Thira (regional unit)
Islands of Greece